Dobrivoj Rusov (born 13 January 1993) is a Slovak footballer who plays for Spartak Trnava as a goalkeeper.

Club career
Rusov was promoted to Spartak Trnava first team in July 2011 from youth teams. He made his league debut against Žilina on 20 October 2012.

In January 2015, he joined Piast Gliwice. He stayed in Gliwice for three years, but did not establish himself as the first choice goalkeeper and mostly served as second choice behind Jakub Szmatuła.

Honours

Club
Spartak Trnava
 Slovak Cup: 2018–19, 2021–22

Individual
 Andel roka (Player of the Year of Spartak Trnava)
 2019, 2020

References

External links
 Corgoň Liga profile
 
 

1993 births
Living people
Sportspeople from Trnava
Slovak footballers
Slovak expatriate footballers
Slovakia youth international footballers
Association football goalkeepers
FC Spartak Trnava players
Slovak Super Liga players
Piast Gliwice players
Ekstraklasa players
Expatriate footballers in Poland
Slovak expatriate sportspeople in Poland